Ray Kolle (born 1941) is an Australian screenwriter best known for his work in television. He was head writer on Neighbours for a number of years.

Selected filmography
In Melbourne Tonight
Bellbird
The Box (TV series)PrisonerNeighboursHome and AwayHeadland''

References

External links

Personal website

1941 births
Living people
Australian television writers
Place of birth missing (living people)
Australian male television writers